The Rattlesnake Hills, also known as Rattlesnake Ridge, is a 16-mile (26 km) long anticline mountain ridge in Yakima County and Benton County in the U.S. state of Washington. It should not be confused with the much smaller Rattlesnake Ridge located near the west end of Ahtanum Ridge just south of Yakima, Washington and west of Union Gap, Washington. The Rattlesnake Hills are part of the Yakima Fold Belt of east-tending long ridges formed by the folding of Miocene Columbia River basalt flows.

The Rattlesnake Hills form the northern edge of the Yakima Valley, running from the vicinity of Benton City to just south of the city of Yakima, where the Yakima River cuts through the mountain ridge via Union Gap. To the west of the Yakima River the mountain ridge is known as Ahtanum Ridge.

North of the Rattlesnake Hills is Moxee Valley and the Black Rock Valley. The hills extend into the Hanford Site. A spur on the north side of the ridge nearly connects with the west end of Yakima Ridge.

Roza Canal, used for agricultural irrigation, passes under the Rattlesnake Hills through a tunnel.

Named high points of the Rattlesnake Hills, according to the USGS, include Elephant Mountain, Zillah Peak, Eagle Peak, High Top, Lookout, and Rattlesnake Mountain.

Rattlesnake Hills AVA 

The Rattlesnake Hills AVA is an American Viticultural Area located in Yakima County and Benton County, Washington in Washington state. United States Alcohol and Tobacco Tax and Trade Bureau (TTB) awarded Rattlesnake Hills its appellation status on March 20, 2006, making Rattlesnake Hills Washington's ninth federally recognized American Viticultural Area. The Rattlesnake Hills AVA is entirely contained within the Yakima Valley AVA, which is in turn is entirely contained within the larger Columbia Valley AVA. The hills form the northern boundary of Yakima Valley, and the AVA includes land between the north bank of the Sunnyside Canal and the entirety of the southern slopes of the Rattlesnake Hills between Outlook and the Wapato Dam. The AVA is centered on the city of Zillah.

Yakima Fold Belt 

The Rattlesnake Ridge is one of the larger "folds" in the Yakima Fold Belt. The Yakima Fold Belt is an area of topographical folds (or wrinkles) raised by tectonic compression. It is a  structural-tectonic sub province of the western Columbia Plateau Province resulting from complex and poorly understood regional tectonics. The folds are associated with geological faults whose seismic risk is of particular concern to the nuclear facilities at the Hanford Nuclear Reservation (immediately north of the Rattlesnake Hills) and major dams on the Columbia and Snake Rivers.

2016 wildfire 

The Range 12 fire was started on July 31, 2016, in eastern Washington, at the Yakima Training Center northeast of Yakima, Washington. The city it started closest to was Moxee, Washington on July 30, 2016 local time. The fire was the third in recent years to affect the area surrounding the Hanford Reach National Monument and the Arid Lands Ecology Reserve near Rattlesnake Ridge. The fire was eventually contained through the use of controlled burns on Rattlesnake Mountain in Benton County due to concerns that the fire was getting too close to the Hanford Nuclear Reservation, which had recently been compared to the Fukushima nuclear disaster by Newsweek magazine.

2018 Rattlesnake Ridge landslide 

As of January 21, 2018, a large but slow landslide is occurring in the Rattlesnake Hills, about 3 miles south of Yakima in Washington, USA. The event first drew news coverage in late 2017, after a long fissure was discovered high on Rattlesnake Ridge: this fissure was reported to be 250 feet deep in one place. The first road closure for public safety was reported on December 17, 2017. The Washington State Department of Natural Resources has a web-page providing information on the event, which reports that the moving mass of basalt is about 4 million tons, covering about 20 acres, and it is slipping roughly south at a rate of about 1.5 feet per week.

On the weekend of January 20–21, 2018 there was flurry of new reporting, which highlighted a developing consensus that the landslide will at some time collapse suddenly, and that is likely to occur within months if not weeks.

References

Ridges of Yakima County, Washington
Landforms of Benton County, Washington
Ridges of Washington (state)